This is a list of Scottish Socialist Party MSPs. It includes all Members of the Scottish Parliament (MSPs) who have sat as Scottish Socialist Party (SSP) members of the Scottish Parliament.

A total of six people have served as SSP MPs.  Tommy Sheridan was elected at the 1999 Scottish Parliament election, and five more SSP MSP were elected at the 2003 election.  Two of the MSPs left the party in August 2006, and all six MSPs were defeated at the May 2007 Scottish Parliament election.

List of MSPs

Notes

References

External links
 Current and previous Members of the Scottish Parliament (MSPs), on the Scottish Parliament website
 Scottish Socialist Party

List
Scottish Socialist Party